Taylar Hender (born May 4, 1998) is an American actress. She is best known for her role as Amy Namey in the 2011 film Judy Moody and the Not Bummer Summer.

Life and career
Hender was born in Columbia, South Carolina and raised in Katy, Texas. She became interested in acting at age five when she sang the Shirley Temple song "On the Good Ship Lollipop" at a school talent show.  From that moment on she decided to act professionally.

She moved to Los Angeles in 2007, where she became a print model and appeared in several commercials for Playmate Toys, AT&T and Claire's Accessories. In 2008, she did voice work on the Disney Junior animated series Can You Teach My Alligator Manners?. From 2009 to 2010 she appeared as herself on the game show, Are You Smarter Than a 5th Grader?. Hender's other acting credits include the Disney Channel film, Den Brother, the sitcom, Good Luck Charlie, and doing voice work on Special Agent Oso.

Hender's most notable acting role to date was in the 2011 film Judy Moody and the Not Bummer Summer as Amy Namey, the best friend to the titular character.

Personal life
Hender resides in Los Angeles, with her mother Missy and brothers Brady and Brandon, who are also actors. She is very close friends with her Den Brother co-star G. Hannelius.

Filmography

References

External links

1998 births
21st-century American actresses
Actresses from Columbia, South Carolina
Actresses from Texas
American child actresses
American film actresses
American television actresses
American voice actresses
Living people
People from Katy, Texas